Brooke McFarlane (born 27 March 1973) is a former Australian cricketer who is a right-handed opening batter. She played 26 List A matches for Victoria in the Women's National Cricket League (WNCL) between 1997–98 and 2005–06.

References

External links
 
 

1973 births
Living people
Australian cricketers
Australian women cricketers
Victoria women cricketers